Zhang Zhen (born 1930) was a Chinese diplomat. He was born in Shanghai. He was Ambassador of the People's Republic of China to Ukraine (1992–1995).

Bibliography
 Українська дипломатична енциклопедія: У 2-х т./Редкол.:Л. В. Губерський (голова) та ін. — К.:Знання України, 2004 — Т.2 — 812с. 

1930 births
Ambassadors of China to Ukraine
Living people
Date of birth missing (living people)
People from Shanghai
Recipients of the Order of Merit (Ukraine), 3rd class